Meredith Madeline Speck (born February 1, 1993) is an American soccer player who plays as a midfielder for the North Carolina Courage of the National Women's Soccer League.

Club career
A former Long Island Fury player, Speck was on the 2015 preseason roster for Portland Thorns FC. She played for Västerås BK30 in 2015. She signed with Western New York Flash in April 2016. The Flash won the 2016 NWSL Championship in penalties over the Washington Spirit.

It was announced on January 9, 2017, that the Western New York Flash was officially sold to new ownership, moved to North Carolina, and rebranded as the North Carolina Courage. Speck made 4 appearances for the Courage, as they won the 2017 NWSL Shield.

In 2018, she made 15 appearances for North Carolina, as they repeated as NWSL Shield winners. Speck was listed as an available substitute in the playoffs but did not appear in either postseason game as the Courage won the 2018 NWSL Championship.

Honors

Club
Western New York Flash
NWSL Champions: 2016

North Carolina Courage
NWSL Champions: 2018, 2019
NWSL Shield: 2017, 2018, 2019

References

External links
Yale bio

1993 births
Living people
American women's soccer players
Yale Bulldogs women's soccer players
Western New York Flash players
National Women's Soccer League players
People from Rockville Centre, New York
Soccer players from New York (state)
Sportspeople from Nassau County, New York
Women's association football midfielders
North Carolina Courage players
Long Island Fury players
Expatriate women's footballers in Sweden
American expatriate sportspeople in Sweden
American LGBT sportspeople
LGBT association football players
Lesbian sportswomen
LGBT people from New York (state)